The MÁV class 601 (nicknamed as "The Giant" or "Big boy" ) is a class of Hungarian four cylinder Mallet -type locomotives, which was designed to haul long and very heavy cargo on very steep railway tracks. With their 22.5 meter length and 2200 KW power, they were the largest and most powerful steam locomotives which have ever built before (and during) the First World War in Europe.

Based on the good operating experience with the series 651 more powerful locomotives arose at the MÁVAG in Budapest from 1914 on, which were especially provided for the line from Karlstadt (today: Karlovac, Croatia) to Fiume (today: Rijeka). By utilisation of the permitted axial load of 16,5t a locomotive was developed, which alone could move freighttrains uphill even on the steep line in the croatian karst without a banking engine.

Frame and chassis
The required traction power required a very large boiler, so an additional running wheel was placed in front of the six coupled bikes. The coupled bikes were therefore mounted in triplicate in a separate frame in accordance with the Mallet system, while the running wheel was mounted in the front frame as an Adams-Webb type axle with a lateral offset of 42–42 mm. In addition, the rear (driving) wheel of the front frame (i.e. the locomotive's fourth wheel) was turned thinner, and the front (locomotive's fifth) wheel of the rear frame was allowed to move laterally by 12–12 mm. The driven axles were made of 3% nickel steel, while the coupled and running axles were made of liquid steel. The axles of driven and coupled bicycles were completely drilled along the axle line. The suspension of the driven wheels, which were riveted together from 28 mm thick solid iron plates and embedded in an internally arranged frame, was connected by dowels. The first, second and fifth wheels were also fitted with tyre lubricators. The two parts of the frame were connected by the so-called Mallet pin. The complete boiler was mounted on the rear frame - the rear frame extended forward over the front frame to support the front of the boiler - and the cab (in the parlance of the time, the 'locomotive galley'). The extension of the rear frame section rested on the front frame section via a sliding plate. The front frame section could pivot laterally around the Mallet pin, and the straightening and 'anti-snaking' was provided by plate springs.

Engine

The rear frame wheels were driven by high-pressure cylinders and the front by low-pressure cylinders. The steam from the high-pressure cylinders was discharged through the cross-flow tube into the common flow tube, which also served as a receiver, and was fitted with a ball joint at the rear. From the transfer hose, the steam was discharged into the piston chambers of the low pressure cylinders. In each frame, the rear of the nickel-steel rims was the actuator. The right-hand cranks were wedged 90° forward on the wheel axle compared to the left-hand cranks. The piston rod was not a through rod on the rear, only on the front. The piston rod sleeves at the rear of each machine had a Schmidt-type metal seal, while the front of the front machine had a closed bushing. The crossheads were two-wire. The drive and coupling rods were of I-shaped cross-section.

To reduce the idling work (resistance) of the steam cylinders, an openable pressure compensating switch connecting the front and rear piston areas of the cylinders and, in the first examples, a Ricour valve on the inlet were fitted, and in later examples air valves were fitted to the piston boxes of the high-pressure cylinders. A compression valve was also fitted to all four cylinders to prevent water hammer. The crossheads were two-wire. In order to facilitate starting, the locomotives were also fitted with a starter, identical in principle to the Borries starter but without a non-return valve, to supply fresh steam to all four cylinders. The steam cylinders were equipped with wide, flexible, self-tensioning cylindrical pushrods with internal inlet, controlled by counter-cranking Heusinger-Walschaert-type camshafts. The high-pressure pistons had a 354 mm diameter, 40 mm internal overlap and 7 mm negative external overlap, while the low-pressure pistons had a 430 mm diameter, 39 mm internal overlap and 4 mm negative external overlap. The counter crank was located nearly 90° ahead of the crank in the forward stroke, in other words, it was wedged as a leading edge in relation to the crank. In accordance with this and the internal inlet, the swinging arch stone was positioned on the upper part of the swinging arch (coulisse) in the forward direction. This arrangement, common on domestic locomotives of the period, is not an advantageous solution for locomotives running predominantly in forward gear, as it causes faster wear of the swinging arch bedding. The steering drawbar, which moved forward when the locomotive was moving forward, was connected to the main spar behind the high-pressure cylinders via the steering lever. Also connected to this strut, by means of an intermediate connecting rod, was the front control linkage trailing arm. The main spar was also connected to the rear control units by separate tie rods on either side. This latter solution was necessary because the large standing boiler prevented the main beam from being positioned at the rear control units.

Boiler

The locomotive's boiler, based on the experience with the types already mentioned, was built with a Brotan-Deffner type water tube boiler and, in keeping with the times, a Schmidt type superheater. The relatively small diameter of the wheels and the high position of the longitudinal boiler made it possible to have a wide standing boiler and thus a wide grate. Due to the height restrictions of the locomotive, the so-called front head consisted of two parallel cylinders, into which the 70 Brotan 85/95 mm pipes, which formed the side of the firebox, ran. At the time of its construction, the steam boilers of MÁV's 601 series locomotives were the largest Brotan boilers in Europe in terms of size and power. The grate consisted of three parts, the first part was hinged. The longitudinal boiler consisted of three belts, the steam dome being located on the first belt and the Pecz-Rejtő feedwater purifiers on the second: two six-cell cylindrical units arranged in parallel under a common casing. The steam dome houses the water separator and the double flat-piston steam regulator with a vertical pusher. The control rod of the structure was routed inside the boiler. The third boiler belt was tapered to connect to the preheaters and the stationary boiler. The boiler was fitted with 188 continuous flues of 46,5/52 mm diameter and a total of 36 continuous flues of 119/127 mm diameter in four rows. The smoke tubes were fitted with superheater elements consisting of 27/34 mm diameter tubes. The American system spark arrestor and the superheater cabinet were installed in the 2892 mm long fume cupboard. The superheating was controlled by means of a superheater protection cabinet and dampers mounted on it, which were moved by a small steam cylinder (the so-called servomotor or automatic). On the first locomotive, the boiler shell was tightly fitted over the Brotan tubes and the front end, so that after the tapered longitudinal boiler tube there was a break in the outer line of the boiler. In later examples, the standing boiler shell was already fitted to the upper arc of the longitudinal boiler and later the first locomotive was also so designed. The boiler was also fitted with 3 4″ MÁV-style[4] direct spring-loaded safety valves and a so-called smoke evacuator. The boiler was fed with water by 2 Friedmann class SZ non-intake, 11 mm orifice, so-called "restarting" fresh steam guns.

Supporting equipment

The dome-shaped sandbox was placed on the locomotive's smoke box, behind the chimney. The sanding device delivered sand in front of the second, third and fourth wheels.

The locomotive was fitted with one Westinghouse-type brake cylinder per frame and was also fitted with a direct-acting regulating brake for use on longer gradients. The brake shoes braked the locomotive's driven wheels from the front, while the running wheels were unbraked as was usual on MÁV locomotives. The brake shoe pressure was almost equal to the traction weight. To ensure safe running on high gradients, the locomotive was also equipped with a Le Chatelier-type back-steam device. The parts in the steam were lubricated by a 10-slot Friedmann LD piston hot parts lubrication pump per frame. In unfavourable adhesion conditions, a compressed air sand blaster was used to apply sand to the coupled rims of the front frame. For sanding the rear wheel set, a second, smaller sand tank was installed at the driver's position. The locomotives were also equipped with an acetylene generator and a Bavarian system of high-pressure steam heating.

References

Steam locomotives of Hungary
Standard gauge locomotives of Hungary
2-6-6-0 locomotives
Railway locomotives introduced in 1914
(1′C)C h4v locomotives